, is a Japanese martial arts manga series written and illustrated by Tetsuya Saruwatari. A sequel series, titled simply as Tough was introduced in 2004 which continues the story further after the first series ended its run. A spin-off series, Oton, was serialized in Business Jump in 2004. A third series, Ryū wo Tsugu Otoko, starring one of illegitimate children of Kiryu Miyazawa, has been serialized in Shueisha's Weekly Playboy since December 21, 2015.

A third-episode anime OVA series was released in 2002.

In North America, Central Park Media licensed the OVA in 2004. Viz Media released six volumes of the first part of the manga in 2005.

Plot 
The story revolves around Kiichi Miyazawa, a 17-year-old teenage high school student and his father, Seiko Miyazawa, who is training him in the family's secret martial art, Nadashinkage-ryu, a fighting style that was created around the end of the Meiji Era Japan. The style itself uses punches, kicks, throws, grappling, as well as knowledge of striking pressure points and vital points on the human body.  With a passion for martial arts, Kiibo is striving to become strong by testing his skills against various fighters from different areas of Japan, as well as the world, via street fights and tournaments.

In the second part of the story, The story starts two years later after the end of high school iron fist legend, the main protagonist Kiichi Miyazawa “Kiibo”, became the heir of his family's martial art Nadashinkage-ryu after the previous one his father Seiko Miyazawa suffered a crushing defeat at the hands of his evil twin brother and Kiichi's uncle Kiryu. In order to pay for hospital bills Kiichi has turned to fighting in illegal underground matches called dark fights in which almost anything is allowed. Kiichi has become a mainstay in these fights, not only because of his outstanding victories but that he refuses to seriously injure any of his opponents, upholding his father's teachings of never killing anyone.

During one particular match in which Kiichi was on the verge of losing, his uncle appeared only to see the progress of his nephew's training and to tempt him into using a killing technique on his adversary. Refusing to give into such treachery Kiichi manages to score a win, it was during this fight that we are revealed that Kiichi mistakenly killed an opponent during a mixed martial arts tournament using a technique that Kiryu taught him. That and the fact that he crippled his father are the main reasons that Kiichi must defeat his uncle.

At the end of Kiichi's last match a secret sect of monks called the Hagyu have sent one of their own students to end the Nadashinkage style and its current practitioners, Suzuki “The Wind” Minoru is the one chosen to defeat Kiichi. Elsewhere several benefactors have formed into starting another MMA tournament called the Hyper Battle, which is held once a year in order to find the world's strongest fighter, a title which is held by one called the Battle King. Kiichi at first seems uninterested but later relents and starts training in order to participate, after challenging students at a karate dojo he comes face to face with the one sent to eliminate him “The Wind” Minoru. After testing their abilities Minoru starts to respect him and asks Kiichi to take him to meet his father. It is here that we are shown the consequences of losing to Kiryu.  
Seiko Miyazawa “The Quiet Tiger” is shown in a childlike state, barely able to feed himself and at times necessitating the use of a wheelchair, he is suffering from apraxia.
 
Wanting to help the man who once defeated the Hagyu, The Wind starts treating him himself with knowledge of acupuncture and pressure point massage, in the past Seiko was challenged by the Hagyu school but made the fight look like it ended in a draw in order to make the school not look bad, Minoru was one of the few to take notice. After much treatment at Minoru's hands Seiko starts to recover from all his conditions baffling all the doctors at his miraculous results. Seiko gives a heartwarming thanks to his son Kiichi for taking care of him these past two years, Kiichi tells his father that the one who cured him has already left, Minoru is seen walking away with an invitation to the Hyper Battle. Later that night Kiichi bids his father a farewell as he goes to participate at the Japanese preliminaries for the Hyper Battle.

Meanwhile, at the sacred Shikabane (corpse) mountain many fighters gather at the preliminaries for the Hyper Battle, among them are many fighters of high renown to the lesser known are fighting for a chance to compete. Kiichi during the extent of 24 hours battles many opponents in order to guarantee a spot in the Hyper Battle, becoming a finalist. Meanwhile, Seiko is shown training once again but he seems to be wracked with feelings of revenge and anger towards Kiryu for what he did to him, and vows to get even with him. After being discharged from the hospital he goes to the apparent resting place of his oldest brother Son-O Miyazawa, who was thought to have been killed by Kiryu many years before and ends up being abducted by a mysterious group of individuals.

Afterwards Kiichi travels to New York City where the Hyper Battle will be held. After meeting up with an old friend he goes to Madison Square Garden where the competition will take place, he encounters many fighters among them Minoru, Kiryu who will do an exhibition fight, his father Seiko who was training with a group called “Team D” and the Japanese Brazilian fighter Mauricio “Jet” Naito who is also a deaf mute. It is at this tournament Kiichi will ultimately have to push the limits of his strength and skill in order to better himself as a fighter and martial artist. He becomes the head of the Nadashinkage school by defeating his father "the quiet tiger" Seiko Miyazawa. It is also revealed during the battle that Kiichi is adopted.

During the battle against his father Kiichi pushes his limits once again and masters the Tiger's paw technique, which was previously thought to only reside within those with pure blood of the Nadashinkage since the Nadashinkage is the only clan that possesses the 3 legs: the dragon, the tiger and the falcon possessed by Kiryuu, Seiko, and Son-O respectively. Kiichi use of the tiger's paw strike to defeat his adopted father Seiko only raises further questions about who his biological father might be.

Kiichi then faces Jet in the finals and although he is being pushed back the whole fight manages to win at the last second by redirecting the energy of Jet's punch to strike back at him, winning the tournament. It is revealed during this fight that Kiryuu is the biological father of Jet, and after the battle, while Kiryuu fights the mob enforces of Gambino and Black heart one of the henchmen gets a clear shot at Kiryuu. The bullet seems to be headed straight for an unaware Kiryuu but Jet jumps in front of the bullet at the last second which pierces him in the throat, it is confirmed in the next chapter that Jet has died from blood loss.

Characters 
 Kiichi Miyazawa (Kiibo)  - Our young hero has been trained in the Nadashinkage Style—a martial art constructed around the art of assassination—from his father since childhood in order to be the next successor. Kiibo must team-up with a rag-tag group of friends in his journey to become a master. He faces the challenge of defeating his numerous adversaries without employing his fighting style's lethal techniques, an ideology his uncle believes make him "weak".
 Seiko Miyazawa (Oton)  - Kiichi's father, 14ths master of the Nadashinkage-Ryu. He has a calm personality, yet will put up a good fight whenever one occurs. A long time ago, before Kiichi was born, Seiko was one of the best fighters in the world. His retirement match against Iron Kiba is still talked about to this day. Hopefully his son will become as good as him.
 Kiryu Miyazawa - Seiko's twin brother and Kiichi's uncle. Unlike his brother, Kiryu is wicked and completely ruthless. In the side story tankōbon "Oton", it is revealed that Kiryu fathered a child with the daughter of the United States President. One of his children, Ryusei Nagaoka is a main character in the third series.
 Son'ō Miyazawa - The eldest Miyazawa sibling believed murdered by Kiryu, according to the series' back story, who later resurfaced as the Battle King of the Hyper Battle, a title bestowed on him because of his great fighting skill and his winning of the last tournament. He also has the ability to change his appearance with the use of a special technique. He is the Battle King
 Kintoki Miyazawa - 13th Master of Nadashinkage-ryu. Father of Seiko, grandfather of Kiichi. 
 Nadashinkage-Ryu - The ancient Martial Art of the Miyazawa Clan, specialising in assassination techniques, it appears to be a complete combat form involving striking, grappling, attacking vital points etc. Each practitioner has an incredible knowledge of the human anatomy and in a more classical approach to martial arts training only the barest minimum of techniques are taught to the students and so they are left to discover their own personal fighting style through constant combat and practice with different martial arts schools, this is especially true in the case of Kiibo as he battles with pro wrestlers, sumo wrestlers, judokas, jiu jitsu experts, karatekas, muay thai fighters, and even more ancient schools of martial arts similar to the Nadashinkage Ryu all within the first part of the manga alone creating his own variations of techniques he has been taught or has observed, in the second part when he is older apart from Dark Fights he also commits dojoyaburi on a regular basis to keep his fighting skills sharp as he at the time unable to train with his father who was disabled by Kiryu, advanced techniques are also only taught through the barest minimum of information in ancient scrolls and advice from one's teacher, the student is then left to perfect the technique through any means necessary, this extremist approach to technique training combined with the hardcore strength and conditioning techniques they use is what makes the students of the Nadashinkage Ryu some of the deadliest fighters on the planet.

Fighters 
 Mitsuhide "Asura" Kuroda  - Master of rival style Nada Shinyō-ryu who becomes Kiichi's friend.
 Masaharu "Iron" Kiba  - The greatest pro wrestler in Japan. A very tall man with massive strength and an artificial eye, he has faced and defeated judoka, wrestlers and boxers through his career. He lost his eye against Seiko and vowed to destroy Nakashinkage-Ryu out of revenge. He is based in both Antonio Inoki and Giant Baba.
 Yoshio Takahashi  - A brutal pro wrestler who was blacklisted from wrestling companies after crippling a Mexican champion named Chico Fernández with a piledriver technique. An eccentric but violent man, he trained muay thai in Thailand for three years, and now works for Iron Kiba. He is based in Yoshiki Takahashi.
 Heizo Onikawa  - Professional wrestler and jiu-jitsu expert, he was regarded as the best grappler on the planet. Kikawa works as a wrestling enforcer. He is based on Volk Han.
 Kiyomasa Samon  - A professional wrestler, disciple of Kikawa.
 Choei Kaneda - A karate master. He looks calm and gentle, but he has a violent side. He is based on Taiei Kin.
 Shingo Aoi  - An agile jiu-jitsu fighter, expert in the use of the flying armbar. He was born in a rich family, but was overlooked by his parents in favour of his ill brother.
 Genshu Ibara  - Aoi's master, a cruel trainer who was in jail for aggression and attack to other schools.
 Goji Kano - The number one school judoka in Japan and a future Olympic. Though he makes himself look like an honorable and respectful opponent, he is actually an arrogant and sadistic young man. His name is taken from Jigoro Kano.
 Noboru "Chōshō" Asada - A shoot wrestling greatmaster. Former university student, he became feared in the pro wrestling world when he destroyed a wrestler who bullied him. He is based on Noboru Asahi.
 Naoya Fujita - Judo world champion. He lived in the shadow of his father, another judo champion, and fought to clear his debts. He is based on Naoya Ogawa.
 Tsuyoshime Kosaka - A fighter who trained his right hand to be as hard as steel. He is based on Tsuyoshi Kohsaka.
 Yosuke Nishijima - Full contact karate champion, more interested in money than fighting. He is based on Yosuke Nishijima.
 Remco Yarobu - Iron Kiba's hitman, he is a gigantic sumo wrestler from Hawaii. He actually wants to gain money for his alcoholic mother. He is based in Akebono Taro and Emmanuel Yarborough.
 Chris Kawaryo - Iron Kiba's hitman, an insanely strong wrestler. He is based on Chris Dolman.
 Krungthep Suwanpakdee - Thailand's muay thai champion.
 Oleg Povirov - A sambo champion who is defeated by Shingo Aoi. He is based in Oleg Taktarov.
 Rodoma - A crazed fighter who became so powerful who lost his human emotions. He is based in Dennis Rodman.
 Peter Kaman - K-1 champion, expert in high kicks. He was abused by his mother as a child. His name is taken from Peter Aerts and Rob Kaman.
 Ricardo Ito - Brazilian jiu-jitsu champion, who is defeated swiftly by García.
 Marvelous Berkeley - A world boxing champion who competed in tournaments to gain money for the costs of his divorce. He becomes a friend to Noboru Asada. His name is based on Charles Barkley, while his character and looks are taken from Mike Tyson.
 Mr. K - Berkeley's manager, who betrays him after he is defeated. He is based on Don King.
 Gas Ripken - Berkeley's coach, based on Bas Rutten.
 Heath Clancy - A fighter from a family of martial artists, who competed in the tournament to fight his brother Gordon to avenge the death of their father, Emilio Clancy. He is defeated by Gordon and learns that their father actually died of cancer. He is based in Royce Gracie.
 Gordon Clancy - Heath's big brother, unbeaten in 500 vale tudo matches. He fights to gain money for his ill son, and can use yoga to control his body. He beats Sergei Kurishichov and Mark Hamilton by choke, but Kiichi defeats him at the end. is based on Rickson Gracie.
 Mark Hamilton - Feared boxer and wrestler. He saw his mother being murdered by his father, which scarred him for life. He had to fly to Japan after sleeping with the wife of a mafia leader. He also wants to defeat Gordon Clancy, but is felled by him. Hamilton is based on Mark Kerr.
 Sergei Kurishichov - Russian judo champion who now works for the police. According to Gordon Clancy, his physical control is impressive, but he is defeated by kesa gatame when Clancy finds his weak point. Yoshio Takahashi is a big fan of his. Based on Sergei Beloglazov.
 Masaya Kono - Pro wrestler and enemy to Yoshio Takahashi. He is a homage to Shinya Hashimoto.
 Shūto Azuma - A gigantic karate expert, who possess the ability to control his breath and muscles. His character is based on Semmy Schilt, while his name comes from Takashi Azuma, the founder of the Daido-Juku Kudo school.
 Shinichi "Fang" Kiba - The son of Iron Kiba. Unlike his father, he has some honor and respect for his opponents.
 Kaz Fujita - Champion of Greco-Roman wrestling, also expert in sambo and boxing, and mentor to Shinichi Kiba. He is based on Kazuyuki Fujita.
 Enzo Sasakawa - A ferocious fighter who does not feel pain due to years of abuse from his parents. He is based on Enson Inoue.
 Rei Sasakawa - Brother of Enzo Sasakawa, he was a disciple of Iron Kiba, but he left to create his own promotion. He is based on Kazuyoshi Ishii.
 Gilbert Senvel - A scary fighter, master in sambo, taekwondo and jiu-jitsu. He is based on Gilbert Yvel.

Media

Manga 
Kōkō Tekken-den Tough is written and illustrated by Tetsuya Saruwatari and was serialized in the Shueisha seinen magazine Weekly Young Jump from 1993 to 2003. Its individual chapters were collected into 42 tankōbon volumes, released between March 13, 1994 and July 18, 2003.

The sequel series, Tough (Latin-script title), continued serialization in the magazine in 2003 and finished in 2012. It has been collected into 39 tankōbon as of August 17, 2012. A spin-off titled  was serialized in Shueisha's Business Jump in 2004. Two volumes have been released.

Viz Media released six volumes of the first manga series under its "Editor's Choice" imprint from January 4, 2005, to April 16, 2006. These volumes omitted some chapters and artwork for graphic violence, and have been discontinued.

A third series titled  started in Weekly Playboy on December 21, 2015.

OVA 
The manga was adapted into a three part OVA. It was released in North America by Central Park Media as Shoot Fighter Tekken in 2004.

Video game 
A video game based on the series titled Tough: Dark Fight was released for the PlayStation 2 console in Japan on December 1, 2005. The fighting game takes place in between the two missing years between the two manga series. The game features a number of characters from the manga, as well as eight new characters.

References

External links 
Tough at Shueisha 
Tough at Viz Media

1994 manga
2002 anime OVAs
2004 manga
Anime International Company
Central Park Media
Martial arts anime and manga
Seinen manga
Shueisha franchises
Shueisha manga
Viz Media manga